The WPA World Eight-ball Championship is a professional eight-ball pool tournament sanctioned by the World Pool-Billiard Association (WPA), initially contested from 2004 to 2012 in Fujairah, United Arab Emirates. After not being held for several years, it was announced by the WPA that the championship would return in 2017, to be held at the Olympic Centre in Jinan, China. However, that event did not occur, and the championship continued to remain dormant until Predator Cues re-established the tournament as part of their Pro Billiard Series, beginning with the 2022 edition of the tournament.

Winners

Top performers

 Active participants are shown in bold.
 In the event of identical records, players are sorted in alphabetical order by first name.

Wheelchair champions

References

 
World championships in pool
Sport in the Emirate of Fujairah
International sports competitions hosted by the United Arab Emirates
Recurring sporting events established in 2004
Recurring events disestablished in 2012
2004 establishments in the United Arab Emirates
2012 disestablishments in the United Arab Emirates